The 2014–15 Tulane Green Wave women's basketball team will represent Tulane University during the 2014–15 NCAA Division I women's basketball season. The season marks the first for the Green Wave as members of the American Athletic Conference. The team, coached by head coach Lisa Stockton, plays their home games at the Devlin Fieldhouse. They finish the season 22–11, 11–7 in AAC play to finish in a tie for fifth place. They advanced to the semifinals of the American Athletic women's tournament where they lost to South Florida. They received an at-large bid to the NCAA women's tournament, where they lost to Mississippi State in the first round.

Media
All Green Wave games will be broadcast on WRBH 88.3 FM. A video stream for all home games will be on Tulane All-Access, ESPN3, or AAC Digital. Road games will typically be streamed on the opponents website, though conference road games could also appear on ESPN3 or AAC Digital.

Roster

Schedule and results

|-
!colspan=9 style="background:#00331A; color:#87CEEB;"| Non-conference regular season

|-
!colspan=9 style="background:#00331A; color:#87CEEB;"| Conference regular season

|-
!colspan=12 style="background:#004731;"| 2015 AAC Tournament

|-
!colspan=12 style="background:#004731;"| NCAA Women's Tournament

|-

Rankings
2014–15 NCAA Division I women's basketball rankings

See also
 2014–15 Tulane Green Wave men's basketball team

References

Tulane
Tulane Green Wave women's basketball seasons
Tulane
Tulane
Tulane